Gerakeh (also Romanized as Gerākeh; also known as Gerāgeh) is a village in Pir Bazar Rural District, in the Central District of Rasht County, Gilan Province, Iran. At the 2006 census, its population was 815, in 228 families.

References 

Populated places in Rasht County